Howard Scott Gentry (December 10, 1903 – April 1, 1993) was an American botanist recognized as the world's leading authority on the agaves.

Gentry was born in Temecula, California. In 1931 he received an A.B. (bachelor's) degree in vertebrate zoology from the University of California at Berkeley. In 1947, Gentry received a Ph.D. in botany from the University of Michigan, Dissertation: The Durango Grasslands.

Gentry made his first field trip to the Sierra Madre Occidental of Mexico in 1933. He spent most of the next twenty years exploring and recording the plant life of northwestern Mexico.  He worked for the United States Department of Agriculture from 1950 to 1971.  He made botanical field trips to Europe, India and Africa looking for plants that are useful to man. He was a research botanist with the Desert Botanical Garden in Phoenix, Arizona after 1971. He also collected many of the specimens now at the Huntington Botanical Gardens in San Marino, California.

His 1942 study of the plants of the Río Mayo region of northwestern Mexico became a classic for the extent of its coverage of a previously little-known area.

In addition to purely botanical work, he was interested in ethnobotany, and his plant descriptions include information about their uses by indigenous peoples.

Works 
 Río Mayo Plants of Sonora-Chihuahua (1942), later updated posthumously as Gentry's Rio Mayo Plants (University of Arizona Press, 1998) 
 The Agave Family of Sonora (USDA, 1972)
 The Agaves of Baja California (California Academy of Sciences, 1978)
 Agaves of Continental North America (University of Arizona Press, 1982)

References

Further reading 
 Cunningham, Isabel S. "Howard Scott Gentry: agriculture's renaissance man." Diversity 11 (1987): 23-24.
 Erickson, Jim. "Botanist, agave expert Howard S. Gentry dies." The Arizona Daily Star (April 3, 1993).
 "Famed plant researcher Howard Gentry at age 89" The Press Enterprise (April 8, 1993).
 Hadley, Diana. "'Listening to my mind': Howard Scott Gentry's Recollections of the Rio Mayo." Journal of the Southwest 37 no. 2 (1995): 178-245.
 Pierce, Alison. "The Mexican Apprenticeship: an authority on century plants became so while surviving rebellious Yaquis, bushwhackers and suspicious opium growers." Arizona (February 11, 1979): 40-46.
 "Plant explorer honored by UA, industry and friends." Agri-News 9, no. 2 (July 1990).
 Verbiscar, Anthony J. "Howard Scott Gentry December 10, 1903-April 1, 1993." Economic Botany 47, No.. 3 (1993).
 Walters, James E. "Seeking answers in the desert." Saturday Magazine of the Scottsdale Daily Progress (March 2, 1985): 6-7.

1903 births
1993 deaths
American botanical writers
Botanists with author abbreviations
Botanists active in North America
University of Michigan alumni
20th-century American botanists
20th-century American non-fiction writers
People from Temecula, California
20th-century American male writers
American male non-fiction writers
University of California, Berkeley alumni